Ágúst Eðvald Hlynsson (born 28 March 2000) is an Icelandic football midfielder, who currently plays for Breiðablik.

Club career
Ágúst started his career with Breiðablik before transferring to Norwich City in January 2017. Ágúst then transferred to Brøndby on 31 August 2017. He left Brøndby in April 2019 to join Víkingur Reykjavík.

Ágúst joined AC Horsens in October 2020.

International career
Ágúst has featured for the under-16, under-17, under-18, under-19 and under-21 Icelandic youth national teams.

Personal life
Ágúst is the older brother of Jong Ajax player Kristian Hlynsson.

References

External links

2000 births
Living people
Agust Hlynsson
Agust Hlynsson
Agust Hlynsson
Agust Hlynsson
Association football midfielders
Þór Akureyri players
Norwich City F.C. players
Agust Hlynsson
Agust Hlynsson
AC Horsens players
Fimleikafélag Hafnarfjarðar players
Agust Hlynsson
Danish Superliga players
Agust Hlynsson
Agust Hlynsson
Expatriate men's footballers in Denmark
Expatriate footballers in England
Brøndby IF players
Valur (men's football) players